The Leonardville Reformed Church (originally named Leonard) is a congregation of the Dutch Reformed Church in South Africa (NGK) in the town of Leonardville, Namibia.

Leonard was founded on November 11, 1944, (the eleventh day of the eleventh month as it happened) as the eleventh congregation of the Cape Church in what was known at the time as South West Africa (SWA). Members agreed that it had to be named after the memorable pioneer of the NGK in SWA, the Rev. E.J. Leonard, who often ministered on donkey-cart journeys across the arid plains. The first full-time pastor was hired on January 6, 1945, and thus the Rev. and Mrs. C. van der Merwe arrived in the parish on April 13, 1945. They had to adapt to difficult circumstances upon arrival, living for a year in the consistory of the church hall in Pretorius. The congregation included 500 members inherited from the Gibeon congregation, after just eight years had already grown to over 1,000. The number had declined once more by 2010 to just 176 as the countryside lost population.

The congregation's footprint encompassed more than 25 000 km2. This spread it quite thin, leading to the secession of the Aroab Reformed Church in 1955. There was initially no official capital, and in 1952, there were four essentially independent districts, including Uhlenhorst with 140 members, Blumfeld with around 140, Aroab with around 360, and Pretorius with around 320. The parsonage was located in Pretorius, while each district had its own church hall where services were held once a month; two communions were held a year in each. The Rev. S. Murray became the congregation's second pastor on August 26, 1950.

Select pastors 
 Cornelis van der Merwe, 1945 - 1949
 Samuel Murray, 1950 - 1958
 Petrus Hendrik Christiaan Gideon Landman, 1959 - 1961
 S.J. Pieterse, June 23, 1962 - 1966, then Otavi
 Andries Gouws Auret, 1967 - 1976
 Alwyn Johannes Nagel, 1976 - 1981

Sources 
 Olivier, Rev. P.L. (compiler). 1952. Ons gemeentelike feesalbum. Cape Town/Pretoria: N.G. Kerk-Uitgewers.

External links 
 Photo of the church building on Google Maps

Afrikaner culture in Namibia
Omaheke Region
Churches in Namibia
1944 establishments in South West Africa
Christian organizations established in 1944
Dutch Reformed Church in South Africa (NGK)
Protestantism in Namibia